GBQ may refer to:
 Bozom language
 GBQ Partners, an American professional services firm
 Gigabecquerel (GBq)
 Grande Bibliothèque du Québec
 Guangzhou North railway station, China Railway telegraph code GBQ